Glochiceras is a haploceratid ammonite characterized by  a small, smooth, compressed, evolute shells with large lappets and a median lateral groove. Its geographic distribution is fairly cosmopolitan, but it is limited stratigraphically to the Oxfordian and Kimmeridgian stages in the Upper Jurassic.

The earlier, Bajocian, Cadomoceras is similar overall, except for having a large ventral rostrum and spatulate lappets at the aperture, and coarse ventral plications.

References
Notes

Bibliography
 Arkell et al., 1957  Mesozoic Ammonoidea, Treatise on Invertebrate Paleontology Part L. Geol Society of America and Univ Kansas Press R.C Moore (ed)

Haploceratoidea
Ammonitida genera
Late Jurassic ammonites
Ammonites of Europe
Ammonites of North America